Levada may refer to:
 Levada - an irrigation channel or aqueduct on the island of Madeira.
 Levada, Cape Verde, a village on the island of Santiago, Cape Verde
 Yuri Levada - a renowned Russian sociologist and political scientist.
 Levada Center - the Russian independent non-government polling and sociological research organisation.
 William Levada (1936-2019) - an American cardinal of the Roman Catholic Church.